Martin Kunzler (born 29 April 1947) is a German jazz bassist and music journalist. He gained particular fame through his rororo Jazz-Lexikon published by Rowohlt Verlag, which is now considered the standard German-language work on this musical genre.

Life 
From 1960, he took double bass lessons with Chester Gill, and from 1964 he studied double bass with Michel Delannois as well as music theory with Gerd Watkinson in Basel. In 1967/68, he also held a teaching position at the Pädagogische Hochschule Lörrach in the subjects Double Bass and Workshop for Neue Musik.

Kunzler was also active in avant-garde musical projects with the Tübingen ensemble of Heinz Kunzler and Wolfgang Hamm and the ensembles around Percy Gerd Watkinson. Numerous concerts and tours as a jazz musician followed, among others with Oscar Klein, Raymond Droz, Ewald Heidepriem, Phil Woods, Lee Konitz, Albert Nicholas, Milt Buckner, Attila Zoller, Stu Martin, Jean-Louis Chautemps, Pony Poindexter and above all for many years with the American arranger Bob Carter.

After an interlude at the Badische Zeitung in Freiburg im Breisgau, in 1973 he took over the PR department of  Musikproduktion in Hamburg and later in Mannheim. There he mainly looked after the record labels Harmonia Mundi and Musik Produktion Schwarzwald, one specialising in early music and the other in jazz.

Kunzler also worked as a producer, not in jazz but in the classical field (and there mainly as a specialist for modern and early music). As an editor, he has designed many projects in this field; important permanent partners were Carl Orff, Gary Bertini,  and Peter Michael Hamel.

In 1977 he joined the Boehringer Mannheim as press spokesman, (later Roche Diagnostics), but retained his freelance activities as author and producer. From 1980 onwards, his work for the first edition of the Rowohlt-Jazzlexikon moved into the foreground. It was published in 1988, followed by various supplemented or unchanged new editions and a completely revised new version in 2002. 

Kunzler also collaborates to the Neue Deutsche Biographie of the Bavarian Academy of Sciences. He has also been active in the field of museums, including essayistic contributions for exhibition catalogues and, in 2002, marketing for a major Jean Tinguely retrospective at the Kunsthalle Mannheim.

Work 
 Gerettet auf dem Steinway-Flügel. Bernhard Conz über Conz und andere. Busse Verlag, Herford 1971. 
 Jazz-Lexikon. Extended new edition Rowohlt, Reinbek 2002 (digitally available via Directmedia Publishing Berlin 2006). 
 A–L. . 
 M–Z. .
 Wir und wie wir wohnen. Neu Heidelberg, Heidelberg 2018,

References

External links 
 

German music journalists
Jazz writers
1947 births
Living people
People from Lörrach